Dasyboarmia is a genus of moths in the family Geometridae.

Species
 Dasyboarmia delineata (Walker, 1860)
 Dasyboarmia hyperdasys Prout, 1928
 Dasyboarmia isorropha Prout, 1932
 Dasyboarmia owadai (Sato, 1987)
 Dasyboarmia pilosissima Holloway, 1993
 Dasyboarmia subpilosa (Warren, 1894)

References
 Dasyboarmia at Markku Savela's Lepidoptera and Some Other Life Forms
 Natural History Museum Lepidoptera genus database

Boarmiini